Michael Scott Bloomgren (born January 25, 1977) is an American football coach. He is currently the head football coach at Rice University.  Prior to beginning his coaching career, Bloomgren played the tight end position at Culver–Stockton College.

Biography
Bloomgren prepped at Florida High School in Tallahassee, Florida. He played college football as a tight end at Culver–Stockton College. He graduated from Florida State University magna cum laude with his bachelor’s degree in sports management, with a minor in business, in 1999. During his time at Florida State, he also worked as an undergraduate assistant to the linebackers. After graduating, Bloomgren became a graduate assistant at the University of Alabama. While at Alabama, he earned his master's degree in higher education administration with a 4.0 GPA.

After earning his graduate degree, Bloomgren went on to serve as an assistant at Catawba College (January 2002–March 2005) and Delta State University (March 2005–February 2007). At these schools, he simultaneously worked as the offensive coordinator, offensive line coach, and special teams coach.

After leaving Delta State in February 2007, Bloomgren had a three-week stint at Texas A&M before accepting an offensive quality control position with the New York Jets. He served in this position under Brian Schottenheimer, and Bill Callahan. In 2009, when Rex Ryan became the head coach of the New York Jets, Bloomgren accepted a position as assistant offensive coordinator.

In 2011, Bloomgren accepted the running game coordinator/offensive line coaching position at Stanford under head coach David Shaw. Bloomgren was promoted to offensive coordinator in January 2013.

On December 5, 2017, it was announced that Bloomgren was hired to replace David Bailiff as the head coach at Rice University.

Head coaching record

References

External links
 Rice profile
 Stanford profile

1977 births
Living people
American football tight ends
Alabama Crimson Tide football coaches
Catawba Indians football coaches
Culver–Stockton Wildcats football players
Delta State Statesmen football coaches
Florida State Seminoles football coaches
New York Jets coaches
Rice Owls football coaches
Stanford Cardinal football coaches
Florida State University alumni
University of Alabama alumni
Coaches of American football from Florida
Players of American football from Tallahassee, Florida